Yurii Gun'ko, born in USSR, Belarusian scientists, professor of Inorganic Chemistry at School of Chemistry of Trinity College Dublin (Dublin, Ireland), head of the International research and education centre for physics of nanostructures.

Education
Yurii Gun'ko graduated from Moscow State University in 1987. In 1990 he received Ph.D in Inorganic Chemistry degree from Moscow State University.

Career

Publications
Yurii Gun'ko has over 268 publications in peer reviewed journals and 10 patents.
His h-index is 51.

Awards

Research areas

Prof. Gun'ko has expertise in the areas of inorganic chemistry, science of materials and nanotechnology. His main research interests and activities include magnetic nanoparticles and magnetic fluids for MRI applications; metallasiloxanes; functionalisation of carbon nanotubes; and quantum dots for biomedical applications. The research focuses on the synthesis and characterisation of functional materials and nano-materials.

See also
Graphene
Nanostructures

References

Belarusian scientists
Academics of Trinity College Dublin
Academic staff of ITMO University
Members of the Royal Irish Academy